Code page 737 (CCSID 737) (also known as CP 737, IBM 00737, and OEM 737, MS-DOS Greek) is a code page used under DOS to write the Greek language. It was much more popular than code page 869 although it lacks the letters ΐ and ΰ.

Character set
The following table shows code page 737. Each character is shown with its equivalent Unicode code point. Only the second half of the table (code points 128–255) is shown, the first half (code points 0–127) being the same as code page 437.

References

737